Aleksei Sergeyevich Yurishchev (born 20 October 1978) is a former Russian professional footballer.

Club career
He made his debut in the Russian Premier League in 2001 for FC Torpedo Moscow.

External links
  Profile at Footballfacts

1978 births
People from Novomoskovsk
Living people
Russian footballers
Association football defenders
FC Arsenal Tula players
FC Torpedo Moscow players
FC Ural Yekaterinburg players
FC Khimik-Arsenal players
Russian Premier League players